Ctenochromis pectoralis, the Pangani haplo (short for "haplochromine"), is a species of fish in the family Cichlidae. It was originally characterized in the Pangani River of Tanzania, and may also be present in Kenya. It is listed as extinct by IUCN as a result of a 1996 evaluation, but this appears to be incorrect.  A more recent IUCN publication stated that this species is not endangered in any way.  

Two isolated populations of similar fish have been reported from springs flanking Mount Kilimanjaro, with some disagreement as to whether they represent the same or distinct related species: at the Chemka springs of Tanzania, upstream of the Pangani, and the Mzima Springs, in the Tsavo River drainage, Kenya.  The latter is listed as a distinct, vulnerable species, C. aff. pectoralis, by IUCN.

Sources

pectoralis
Fish described in 1893
Freshwater fish of Africa
Taxonomy articles created by Polbot